The Kam language may be:
Kam language, a Tai–Kadai language also called Dong
Kam language (Nigeria), an Adamawa language also called Nyingwom